Yadunath Pandey is an Indian politician of the Bharatiya Janata Party and was elected as a member of the 9th Lok Sabha, the lower house of the Parliament of India under Prime Minister V. P. Singh representing Hazaribagh between 1989 and 1991.

References

External links 
Report 

Year of birth missing (living people)
Living people
Lok Sabha members from Jharkhand
People from Hazaribagh
Bharatiya Janata Party politicians from Jharkhand
India MPs 1989–1991